Forty Days and Forty Nights (Turkish: Kırk gün kırk gece) is a 1953 Turkish film directed by Esat Özgül.

Cast
 Ismail Dümbüllü 
 Nimet Alp 
 Temel Karamahmut 
 Mücap Ofluoglu 
 Feridun Çölgeçen 
 Lale Seven 
 Osman Alyanak 
 Muazzez Arçay

References

Bibliography
 Türker İnanoğlu. 5555 afişle Türk Sineması. Kabalcı, 2004.

External links
 

1953 films
1950s Turkish-language films
Turkish comedy films
Films directed by Esat Özgül
Turkish black-and-white films